Sandhya Dwarkadas is a professor and Chair of the Department of Computer Science at the University of Virginia.  She was formerly the Albert Arendt Hopeman Professor of Engineering and Professor and Chair of the Department of
Computer Science at the University of Rochester. She is known for her research on shared memory and reconfigurable computing.

Education
Dwarkadas was educated at the Indian Institute of Technology Madras and Rice University, completing her Ph.D. at Rice in 1993. Her dissertation, Synchronization, Coherence, and Consistency for High Performance Shared-Memory Multiprocessing, was jointly supervised by J. Robert Jump and Bart Sinclair.

Recognition
Dwarkadas became a fellow of the Institute of Electrical and Electronics Engineers in 2017.
She was elected as an ACM Fellow in 2018 for "contributions to shared memory and reconfigurability".

References

External links
Interview with Sandhya Dwarkadas, Amanda Stent, Computing Research Association Women

Year of birth missing (living people)
Living people
American computer scientists
Indian computer scientists
American women computer scientists
IIT Madras alumni
Rice University alumni
University of Rochester faculty
Fellows of the Association for Computing Machinery
Fellow Members of the IEEE
American women academics
21st-century American women